The 98th Assembly District of Wisconsin is one of 99 districts in the Wisconsin State Assembly.  Located in southeastern Wisconsin, the district comprises part of central Waukesha County, including the entire city of Pewaukee and the village of Pewaukee, as well as part of the city of Waukesha.  The district is represented by Republican Adam Neylon, since April 2013.

The 98th Assembly district is located within Wisconsin's 33rd Senate district, along with the 97th and 99th Assembly districts.

List of past representatives

References 

Wisconsin State Assembly districts
Waukesha County, Wisconsin